Dumpling Creek is a stream in Henry County in the U.S. state of Missouri. It is a tributary of the South Grand River within Harry S Truman Reservoir.

The origin of the name Dumpling Creek is obscure.

See also
List of rivers of Missouri

References

Rivers of Henry County, Missouri
Rivers of Missouri